Wait to Pleasure is the second studio album by Canadian shoegaze band No Joy. The album was released in April 2013 on Mexican Summer.

Two singles were released from the album, "Lunar Phobia" on February 19, 2013, and "Hare Tarot Lies" on April 2, 2013.

Track listing

References

2013 albums
No Joy albums
Mexican Summer albums